Helen Reeves (born 6 September 1980 in Fleet, Hampshire) is a British slalom canoeist who competed at the international level from 1996 to 2004.

She won a bronze medal in the K1 event at the 2004 Summer Olympics in Athens.

Reeves also won two bronze medals in the K1 team event at the ICF Canoe Slalom World Championships, earning them in 2002 and 2003.

World Cup individual podiums

References

Yahoo! Sports Athens 2004 profile

1980 births
English female canoeists
Canoeists at the 2004 Summer Olympics
Living people
Olympic canoeists of Great Britain
Olympic bronze medallists for Great Britain
Olympic medalists in canoeing
British female canoeists
Medalists at the 2004 Summer Olympics
Sportspeople from Nottingham
Medalists at the ICF Canoe Slalom World Championships